Winterset is a city in and the county seat of Madison County, Iowa. The population was 5,353 at the time of the 2020 census.

Winterset is part of the Des Moines metropolitan area. It is the birthplace of actor John Wayne.

History

Winterset was platted during a cool spell in the summer of 1849. The name was originally to be "Summerset", but the unseasonable coldness made the commissioners reverse this to "Winterset".

On March 5, 2022, a low-end EF4 tornado struck the areas just outside the city, killing six people.

Geography
Winterset is located in central Madison County at the intersection of US Route 169 and Iowa State Highway 92. Middle River flows past the south side of the city.  It is approximately 30 miles southwest of the state capital of Des Moines.

Climate

According to the Köppen Climate Classification system, Winterset has a hot-summer humid continental climate, abbreviated "Dfa" on climate maps.

Demographics

2010 census
At the 2010 census there were 5,190 people, 2,062 households, and 1,336 families living in the city. The racial makeup of the city was 98.1% White, 0.2% African American, 0.2% Native American, 0.4% Asian, 0.4% from other races, and 0.7% from two or more races. Hispanic or Latino of any race were 2.0%.

Of the 2,062 households 33.7% had children under the age of 18 living with them, 51.5% were married couples living together, 9.9% had a female householder with no husband present, 3.3% had a male householder with no wife present, and 35.2% were non-families. 31.7% of households were one person and 16% were one person aged 65 or older. The average household size was 2.42 and the average family size was 3.05.

The median age was 38.4 years. 26.8% of residents were under the age of 18; 6.4% were between the ages of 18 and 24; 24.3% were from 25 to 44; 23.9% were from 45 to 64; and 18.6% were 65 or older. The gender makeup of the city was 46.6% male and 53.4% female.

2000 census
At the 2000 census there were 4,768 people, 1,884 households, and 1,230 families living in the city. The racial makeup of the city was 98.87% White, 0.06% African American, 0.15% Native American, 0.27% Asian, 0.13% from other races, and 0.52% from two or more races. Hispanic or Latino of any race were 0.59%.

Of the 1,884 households 32.9% had children under the age of 18 living with them, 53.1% were married couples living together, 9.9% had a female householder with no husband present, and 34.7% were non-families. 31.5% of households were one person and 18.1% were one person aged 65 or older. The average household size was 2.39 and the average family size was 3.01.

Age spread: 25.8% under the age of 18, 7.3% from 18 to 24, 25.5% from 25 to 44, 20.3% from 45 to 64, and 21.0% 65 or older. The median age was 39 years. For every 100 females, there were 86.4 males. For every 100 females age 18 and over, there were 78.2 males.

The median household income was $33,142 and the median family income was $42,951. Males had a median income of $31,536 versus $22,146 for females. The per capita income for the city was $17,274. About 5.8% of families and 8.4% of the population were below the poverty line, including 8.9% of those under age 18 and 14.6% of those age 65 or over.

Arts and culture

Winterset is widely known for its covered bridges. A total of six covered bridges are located in Madison County, including one in Winterset City Park. The annual Covered Bridge Festival celebrates the bridges and local heritage every second weekend in October.

The Winterset Stage is Madison County's live theatre venue providing family friendly dinner theatre, including musicals and concerts while offering a variety of children's theatre and educational programming. The Winterset Stage is a non-profit 501c3 organization located at 405 East Madison in Winterset.

Another notable landmark is Clark Tower, located in Winterset City Park, which offers panoramic views of the surrounding Middle River Valley area.

The Madison County Courthouse, in the middle of the town square, was built in 1868, and rebuilt in 1876 after being partially destroyed by fire.

Museums

In 2015, the John Wayne Birthplace Museum opened kitty-corner from Wayne's birthplace home. The $2.5m, 6,000 sq. ft. facility houses scripts, costumes, set pieces, posters, personal correspondence, an original Andy Warhol painting and a custom-made 1972 Pontiac station wagon. The museum is divided into three exhibitions: "The Actor", "The Family Man", and "The American". It is located at 205 S. John Wayne Dr. in Winterset.

The Iowa Quilt Museum offers seasonal exhibits and regular workshops. The current president of the museum, Marianne Fons, is the founder of the well known quilting show Fons & Porter's Love of Quilting. The museum is located on the south side of the town square at 68 E. Court Ave.

The Madison County Historical Society is an 18 acre complex on the south side of town featuring 14 restored and historical buildings. The focal point of the complex is the Victorian Bevington-Kaser manor. Built in 1856, the manor has been fully restored. The complex is open May through October and is located at 815 S. 2nd Ave.

Education
The Winterset Community School District operates local public schools.

Popular culture
Winterset was used as a shooting location for the films Cold Turkey (1971), The Bridges of Madison County (1995), and The Crazies (2010).

Notable people

 Robert O. Bare, Marine Corps lieutenant general
 George Washington Carver, agricultural researcher
 Fred Clarke, member of the Baseball Hall of Fame
 Henry J. B. Cummings, U.S. representative from Iowa
 Gail Huff, American broadcast journalist; wife of former U.S. senator and ambassador Scott Brown
 Mark Pearson, TV and radio personality
 Edward McMurray Smith, Iowa secretary of state
 George L. Stout, art conservation pioneer, World War II "Monument Man"
 John Wayne, actor
 Col. David Woodley, music professor and band director

References

External links

 
City of Winterset Official website
Madison County Historical Society
City-Data Comprehensive Statistical Data and more about Winterset

 
Cities in Madison County, Iowa
Cities in Iowa
County seats in Iowa
Des Moines metropolitan area
Populated places established in 1849
1849 establishments in Iowa